The 2012–13 Air Force Falcons men's basketball team represented the Air Force Academy. Led by head coach Dave Pilipovich who was his 1st full season as a head coach. They played their home games at the Clune Arena on the Air Force Academy's main campus in Colorado Springs, Colorado and were a member of the Mountain West Conference. They finished the season 18–14, 8–8 in Mountain West play to finish in sixth place. They lost in the quarterfinals of the Mountain West tournament to UNLV. They were invited to the 2013 CIT where they defeated Hawaii in the first round before losing in the second round to Weber State.

Roster

Schedule and results 

|-
!colspan=9 |Exhibition

|-
!colspan=9 | Regular season

 
|- 
!colspan=9| 2013 Mountain West Conference men's basketball tournament
|- 

|-
!colspan=9| 2013 CIT

See also 
 2012–13 NCAA Division I men's basketball season
 2012–13 NCAA Division I men's basketball rankings

References 

Air Force
Air Force Falcons men's basketball seasons
Air Force
Air Force Falcons
Air Force Falcons